A narrow-track vehicle is a vehicle that leaves a narrow ground track as it moves forward. Narrow-track vehicles may have lateral stability when stationary but usually lean into turns to prevent falling towards the outside.

Narrow-track vehicles have unique dynamics that, in the case of wheeled vehicles, may be similar to bicycle and motorcycle dynamics and that may include countersteering. Narrow-track vehicles can roll on wheels, slide, float, or hydroplane. The narrow profile can result in reduced aerodynamic drag, increased fuel efficiency, and reduced pavement requirements. These types of vehicles have also been described as "man-wide vehicles" (MWV).

Wheeled
tilting trike
skateboard and all its varieties, such as the snakeboard

Sliding
skibob (when used with foot skis)

Intermittent contact
bipedal robot

Floating
surfboard

References

Vehicles by type